The 2013 Asian Men's Club Volleyball Championship was the 14th staging of the AVC Club Championships. The tournament was held in Azadi Indoor Stadium, Tehran, Iran.

Pools composition
The teams are seeded based on their final ranking at the 2012 Asian Men's Club Volleyball Championship.

* Withdrew

Preliminary round
Pool A

|}

|}

Pool B

|}

|}

Pool C

|}

|}

Pool D

|}

|}

Classification round
 The results and the points of the matches between the same teams that were already played during the preliminary round shall be taken into account for the classification round.''

Pool E

|}

|}

Pool F

|}

|}

Pool G

|}

|}

Pool H

|}

|}

Classification 9th–12th

Semifinals

|}

11th place

|}

9th place

|}

Final round

Quarterfinals

|}

5th–8th semifinals

|}

Semifinals

|}

7th place

|}

5th place

|}

3rd place

|}

Final

|}

Final standing

Awards
MVP:  Hamzeh Zarini (Kalleh)
Best Scorer:  Michael Sánchez (Al-Rayyan)
Best Spiker:  Huang Chien-feng (Taiwan Power)
Best Blocker:  Mohammad Mousavi (Kalleh)
Best Server:  Farhad Ghaemi (Kalleh)
Best Setter:  Vlado Petković (Kalleh)
Best Libero:  Kong Fanwei (Liaoning)

References

External links
Asian Volleyball Confederation
Official Website

Asian Men's Club Volleyball Championship
Asian Men's Club Volleyball Championship
International volleyball competitions hosted by Iran